Anna Salome of Manderscheid-Blankenheim (12 December 162815 March 1691) was Abbess of Thorn Abbey from 1648 to 1688, and the abbess of Essen Abbey from 1688 until her death.

Life 
Anna was a daughter of Count John Arnold of Manderscheid-Blankenheim (1605–1644) and his wife Antoinette Elisabeth of Manderscheid-Gerolstein (1608–1650).  In 1640, Anna Salome and her three years younger sister Clara Elisabeth of Manderscheid-Blankenheim, received a prebend in Thorn Abbey and a few years later, one from Essen as well.  Only eight years after her entry into Thorn Abbey, she was elected abbess at age 20. This was partly due to the fact that the Manderscheid and related families held a majority of the prebends, and also to Anna Salome's personal influence and ability.

She was highly educated and when she died, she left a private library of over one hundred books.  The catalogue includes books on political, legal, geographical, historical subjects and even on medical instruments.  Anna Salome ruled her abbeys herself, and even wrote legal briefs for her abbey in Essen.

References 
 Ute Küppers-Braun: Ein Wunder in Thorn? Clara Elisabeth von Manderscheid-Blankenheim und Markus von Aviano, in: Das Münster am Hellweg, issue 60, 2007, Online, pp. 63–86.
 Ute Küppers-Braun: Frauen des hohen Adels im kaiserlich-freiweltlichen Damenstift Essen (1605–1803). Eine verfassungs- und sozialgeschichtliche Studie. Zugleich ein Beitrag zur Geschichte der Stifte Thorn, Elten, Vreden und St. Ursula in Köln, vol. 8 in the series Quellen und Studien, Aschendorffsche Verlagsbuchhandlung, Münster, 1997,  (8), also: thesis, University of Essen, Essen, 1995.

External links 
 Entry at genealogieonline.nl

1628 births
1691 deaths
17th-century German people
German countesses
Abbesses of Essen
Abbesses of Thorn